Les Cowboys Fringants are a Quebec folk rock music group formed in 1995 in Repentigny, Quebec. The French word fringant can be translated as "dashing", or "frisky".

They perform Québécois néo-trad music (modernized Quebec folk music with a rock flavour) and draw on country music. They have an international underground following, especially in France, French-speaking Belgium and Switzerland. Band members hail from the Montreal suburbs of Repentigny and L'Assomption. The entire band collaborates on the lyrics, although guitarist Jean-François Pauzé often contributes more than the others. The band are known for their live performances, captured on the Attache ta tuque! live album and the Centre Bell 30 décembre 2003 DVD.

The band has won 17 Félix Awards, including five at the 2020 edition of the ceremony.

Overview
Les Cowboys represent an important part of modern Québécois music. They are part of the néo-trad movement that appeared in Quebec around the turn of the 21st century, and they embody a resurgence of political songwriting. As the néo-trad movement adapts Quebec folklore into contemporary crafts, the political message of the band is a re-occurrence of 1970s chansonnier activist messages of left-wing solidarity and, recently, sovereignism. They also sometimes adopt a minimalist and dadaesque style, a trend of the Quebec music scene of the 2000s – a decade of voluntary simple yet nonetheless quite intelligent and joual lyrics, therefore subversive and akin to a sort of lyrical naïve art.

The group's songs cover environmentalism, and poverty, as well as the denouncing of consumerism, exploitation, state-controlled gambling, and political apathy. While some of those subjects are serious in appearance, they are often treated in a light manner, sometimes even in a fun or ironic way. The band also deals with themes of Quebec history, Quebec independence, suburban life, childhood and adolescence, kitsch, relationships and sports. Their songwriting is renowned for having woven an elaborate tapestry of fictional characters with interpersonal relationships, and sometimes a number of these characters appear in more than one song. Much like their writing, the clothes of the male members of the band are quite unique, sometimes purposely normal or kitsch and something of a postmodern, second degree artistic statement.

The band themselves are noted fans of Passe-Partout composer Pierre F. Brault and have performed shows in his honour. They have also been influenced by French singer Renaud, and his songs with political messages and local popular language.

Many of the idiosyncrasies of their music stem from Marie-Annick Lépine, a versatile musician, who makes the band line-up distinct from the conventional guitar-bass-drums-singer. Her talents contribute to the vivacious sounds of instruments like the violin, mandolin and accordion.

The band went on tour in summer of 2011, visiting cities in Quebec, France and Switzerland.

In 2021, the band released a concert film, L'Amérique pleure, featuring songs performed in wild locations in Quebec, directed by Louis-Philippe Eno. It was released as an on-demand digital film.

Members 

Current lineup:
 Karl Tremblay - vocals
 Jean-François "J-F" Pauzé - rhythm guitar
 Marie-Annick Lépine - violin, mandolin, accordion, piano, banjo
 Jérôme Dupras - bass guitar, double bass

Previous members:
 Dominique "Domlebo" Lebeau - drums – Left in 2007, citing personal reasons

Discography 

Studio albums
12 Grandes chansons (1997)
Sur mon canapé (1998)
Motel Capri (4 April 2000)
Break syndical (5 March 2002)
La Grand-Messe (23 November 2004)
L'expédition (23 September 2008)
Sur un air de déjà vu (14 October 2008)
Que du vent (14 November 2011)
Octobre (23 October 2015)
Les antipodes (4 October 2019)
Les nuits de Repentigny (12 March 2021)

Compilations
Enfin Réunis (12 grandes chansons + Sur Mon Canapé) (20 November 2001)

Live albums
Attache ta tuque! (13 May 2003)
Au Grand Théâtre de Québec (2007)
En concert au Zénith de Paris (2010)

Recorded concerts
Centre Bell 30 décembre 2003 – (13 April 2004)

See also 

Néo-trad
List of bands from Canada
Music of Canada
Music of Quebec

References

External links 
 
 

Musical groups established in 1997
Musical groups from Montreal
Canadian folk rock groups
People from Repentigny, Quebec
1997 establishments in Quebec
Félix Award winners
Quebec sovereigntists